Professor Henrietta Bowden-Jones OBE (born 27 April 1964) is a medical doctor, Psychiatrist, Honorary Professor at University College London and Honorary Senior Visiting Fellow, Dept of Psychiatry at Cambridge University.

In 2008 she founded and became Director of the National Problem Gambling Clinic, the first centre to treat gambling disorder. This clinic remained the only centre of its kind for 12 years and has been inundated by thousands of referrals since its opening in 2008. Now it holds an extensive national database on pathological gambling.

In 2019 she was advisor to NHS England on the 10 year Long Term  Plan for Gambling Disorder.  The original clinic she had founded and run for over a decade was commissioned as the template for another 15 NHS funded clinics designated to the treatment of gambling Disorder.  One of these became the Young People's Gambling services also run from the same central site under Henrietta's leadership.

In 2019 with NHS funding, she founded the National Centre for Gaming Disorders, the first NHS centre to treat Gaming Disorder following the inclusion of this addiction in the new International Classification of diseases (ICD 11). The National Centre for Gaming Disorders, part of CNWL NHS Trust, treats people as young as 13 and in its first year significantly over-performed the planned commissioning targets set by NHS England.

In 2019 Henrietta Bowden-Jones was also appointed as Honorary Professor at University College London Division of Psychology and Language Sciences.

In 2020 she became Honorary Senior Visiting Fellow, Dept of Psychiatry at Cambridge University. Henrietta co-founded the National UK Behavioural Addictions Research Group, based in the Dept of Psychiatry. The group has brought together researchers with expertise in different spheres of behavioural addictions ranging form neurobiology to epidemiology and clinical research.

She is now the Director of the newly established NHS funded Centre for Behavioural Addictions overseeing the work of both the National Problem Gambling Clinic and the Centre for Internet and Gaming Disorders.

Immediate President of the Medical Women's Federation ( 2018–2020).

Current President of the Royal Society of Medicine Psychiatry Section. 2020-2022 and Royal Society of Medicine Trustee 2021-2024.

Royal College of Psychiatrists Spokesperson for Behavioral Addictions.

Henrietta Bowden-Jones was appointed as a board member of the Howard League Crime and Problem Gambling Commission  2019-2022

Bowden-Jones appointed as a board member on the Board of Science Committee British Medical Association. (2021-2024)

Early life and education 
Bowden-Jones was born in Turin, Italy to an Italian mother and British father. She studied medicine at the University of Pavia. Bowden-Jones specialised in psychiatry on the Charing Cross Hospital Psychiatry Rotation at the Chelsea and Westminster Hospital. She earned a Doctorate of Medicine in neuroscience at Imperial College London. Her postgraduate research focuses on the ventromedial prefrontal cortex of alcohol dependency, using computerised neuropsychological assessments including the Cambridge gamble task.

Career 
Bowden-Jones has worked in Addiction Psychiatry for all of her NHS consultant career, starting with running the Soho Rapid Access Clinic for homeless opiate addicted patients to running the NHS addictions inpatient facility in central London for alcohol and all drug addictions for many years before moving to the field of Behavioural Addictions and opening the two national centres.

She is a co-opted member (Behavioural Addictions) of the Faculty of Addictions at the Royal College of Psychiatrists.

She was a Trustee of Sporting Chance Clinic 2007 - 2015 and a Trustee of Action on Addiction 2017-2020

In 2008 she established the Problem Gambling Consortium, a UK-wide collaboration that investigates the neurobiology and the clinical underpinnings of gambling disorder, the research published from the group is available on Researchgate.

Her approach has been described as "innovative and experimental" as she trialed the use of Naltrexone and Group Cognitive Behavioral Therapy. The National Centre for Behavioural Addictions also supports family members who struggle with the results of problem gambling and gaming disorder.

In the 2019 New Year's Honours List she was made an Officer of the British Empire for her work in addiction treatment and research.

In 2021 she has been called on as an expert in the field to advise the All Party Group on Reducing Harm Related to Gambling in Northern Ireland and the Welsh Task and Finish Group on Gambling Harm.

Awards 
 2020 Psychiatrist of the Year, Royal College of Psychiatrists.
2019 Order of the British Empire
 2018 National Health Service Women Leaders Award
 2015 National Council on Problem Gambling Joanna Franklin Gambling Treatment Award
 2014 Women of Achievement Award in Health Category, Women in the City
 2014 Royal College of Psychiatrists Public Educator of the Year Award (finalist)
 2010 The Times Best Doctors in Britain
 2006 Specialist Clinical Addiction Network Award
 2003 Imperial College London Hallinan Young Researcher Award

Books 
 2019 Harm Reduction for Gambling: A Public Health Approach - Routledge
 2017 Problem Gambling in Women: An International Female Perspective on Treatment and Research - Routledge
2017 Are We All Addicts Now? - Liverpool University Press
 2015 A Clinician's Guide to working with Problem Gamblers - Routledge

References 

1965 births
Living people
Alumni of Imperial College London
British women psychiatrists
Officers of the Order of the British Empire
University of Pavia alumni